The John Mayfield House is a historic house in Glasgow, Kentucky. It was built in the 1830s for John Mayfield and his family. It was later acquired by W. L. Steffey, and his family inherited the property after his death. It was designed in the Federal architectural style. It has been listed on the National Register of Historic Places since May 20, 1983.

References

National Register of Historic Places in Barren County, Kentucky
Federal architecture in Kentucky
Houses completed in 1830
1830s establishments in Kentucky
Houses in Barren County, Kentucky
Houses on the National Register of Historic Places in Kentucky
Glasgow, Kentucky